Chris Kennedy (1 December 1948 – 27 August 2013) was an Australian AFI Award winning film director, film writer, producer and novelist.  He owned the company, Oilrag Productions and Oillamp Books. Kennedy was a three-time Australian Film Institute Awards nominee and an Australian Writer's Guild Award winner.

He made his first film Glass, a low budget thriller, in 1989 and followed it up with This Won't Hurt a Bit, in 1993.
During the 1990s he made Doing Time for Patsy Cline and the following decade, A Man's Gotta Do.

He initially trained and qualified as a dentist and later studied at film school In 2011 he added novel writing to his range of creative pursuits.

Chris Kennedy died from a heart attack on 27 August 2013.

Select Credits

Film
Glass (1989)
This Won't Hurt a Bit (1993)
Doing Time for Patsy Cline (1997)
A Man's Gotta Do (2003)

Print
Made in Australia (2011)

References

External links

Oil Rag Productions and Oil Lamp Books – Chris Kennedy's company

1948 births
2013 deaths
20th-century Australian novelists
21st-century Australian novelists
Australian dentists
Australian film directors
Australian film producers
Australian male novelists
Australian screenwriters
Australian male screenwriters
20th-century Australian male writers
21st-century Australian male writers
20th-century dentists